In Finland, a pefletti (Finnish and colloquial Finland Swedish) is a sheet of paper, cardboard, cloth, foam rubber or other soft material that is placed on the sauna bench and then sat on.

Purpose
The purpose of pefletti is to maintain sanitary conditions in a sauna with a wide user base by preventing genital contact with the bench. Another reason is to prevent uncomfortable feeling because of the heat. The pefletti come in both disposable and re-usable varieties. 

The word pefletti is a combination of the Finnish words "peffa", which is a mild slang word for one's behind, and "tabletti", meaning placemat. The pefletti has a role in the very traditional yet various sauna habits in Finland.

The larger kind of "pefletti" made of linen or cotton fabric, that covers either the majority of the width of the sauna bench, or a single seat of the bench and backrest for one sitter is called a laudeliina. This cloth is usually washed after each use and used for sanitary and comfort purposes such as the pefletti. 

Sauna
Finnish culture